FK Sileks is a football club based in Kratovo, North Macedonia who play in the Macedonian First League.

History
The club was founded in 1965.

Sileks biggest accomplishment in 90s came in the Yugoslav Cup where they reached the quarter-final. It was a remarkable achievement considering they defeated both Sarajevo teams, FK Željezničar and FK Sarajevo in back to back rounds. Since the formation of the First Macedonian Football League, they played at top level from the start until their relegation in 2013. Their biggest success happened during the 90s, when they won three league titles (including a record five time runners-up) and two national cups.
After 24 years finally Silkes managed to win the Macedonian cup. Beating Akademia Pandev on PK 3-2 after scoreless draw 0-0 in 120 mins extra time.

Home ground 
 Stadium Sileks (Macedonian: Градски стадион Силекс-Кратово) is a multi-purpose stadium in Kratovo, North Macedonia. It is currently used mostly for football matches and is the home stadium of FK Sileks. The stadium holds 1,800 seats.

Honours

 Macedonian First League:
Winners (3): 1995–96, 1996–97, 1997–98
Runners-up (6): 1992–93, 1993–94, 1994–95, 1998–99, 2003–04, 2019–20

 Macedonian Second League:
Winners (2): 2013–14, 2021–22

 Macedonian Republic Cup:
Winners (2): 1988–89, 1989–90

 Macedonian Football Cup:
Winners (3): 1993–94, 1996–97, 2020–21
Runners-up (2): 1994–95, 2021–22

Recent seasons

1The 2019–20 season was abandoned due to the COVID-19 pandemic in North Macedonia.

Sileks in Europe

UEFA club competition record

Results

Players

Current squad

Historical list of coaches

 Zoran Smileski (1995 –1998)
 Gjoko Hadžievski (1998 –1999)
 Lazar Plackov (1999)
 Zoran Mitevski (2000)
 Momcilo Mitevski (2000 –2001)
 Nenad Stavrić (2001 –2002)
 Momcilo Mitevski (2002 –2003)
 Nebojša Petrović (2003 –Sep 2005)
 Kire Trajcev (Sep 2005 –Jan 2006)
 Josip Pirmajer (10 Jan 2006 –Jun 2006)
 Slavko Jović (Jul 2006 –Feb 2007)
 Momcilo Mitevski (4 Mar 2007 –Jun 2007)
 Marjan Sekulovski (Jul 2007 –Oct 2008)
 Ane Andovski (19 Oct 2008 –Jun 2012)
 Ljubodrag Milošević (Jul 2012 –Sep 2012)
 Nebojša Petrović (4 Oct 2012 –Apr 2013)
 Trajce Senev (20 Apr 2013 –Jun 2014)
 Gordan Zdravkov (Jul 2014 –Dec 2014)
 Zoran Shterjovski (Jan 2015 –Jun 2015)
 Momchilo Mitevski (Jul 2015 –May 2016)
 Gordan Zdravkov (Jun 2016 –Jul 2016)
 Zikica Tasevski (25 Oct 2016 –30 Sep 2018)
 Goran Simov (Apr 2019 –)

References

External links
Club info at MacedonianFootball 
Football Federation of Macedonia 
Sileks at Facebook 
Sileks at UEFA.COM 
Sileks at EUFO.DE 
Sileks at Weltfussball.de 

 
Football clubs in North Macedonia
Association football clubs established in 1965
1965 establishments in the Socialist Republic of Macedonia
Football clubs in Yugoslavia